Taylor, Oklahoma may refer to:

Taylor, Beckham County, Oklahoma, an unincorporated community
Taylor, Cotton County, Oklahoma, an unincorporated community